Nogometni klub Branik Šmarje, commonly referred to as NK Branik Šmarje or simply Branik Šmarje, is a Slovenian football club from Šmarje. The club was founded in 1951 and currently competes only with youth selections.

Honours

Littoral League (fourth tier)
 Winners: 1992–93

MNZ Koper Cup
 Winners: 1996

References

External links
MNZ Koper profile 

Association football clubs established in 1951
Football clubs in Slovenia
1951 establishments in Slovenia